John A. “Trea” Pipkin III (born 1980/1981)  is a Judge of the Georgia Court of Appeals.

Education

Pipkin earned his associate degree from Reinhardt College, a bachelor's degree from the University of Georgia, and a J.D. degree from the Georgia State University College of Law.

Legal and academic career

He previously served as Assistant District Attorney for the Flint Circuit District Attorney's Office and as an adjunct professor of law at the Emory University School of Law. He is currently an adjunct professor of law at Gordon State College.

State court service

On December 21, 2017, Governor Nathan Deal announced Pipkin as his appointment to serve as a Superior Court Judge of the Henry County Superior Court. He succeeded Wade Crumbley who retired on December 31, 2017. Pipkin also served as Solicitor-General in McDonough, Georgia from 2012–2018.

Appointment to Georgia Court of Appeals

Pipkin was one of six applicants who applied for the vacancy on the Georgia Court of Appeals due to the death of Stephen S. Goss on August 24, 2019. On March 27, 2020, Governor Brian Kemp appointed Pipkin to the Georgia Court of Appeals. He was sworn into office on April 10, 2020.

References

External links

1980s births
Living people
20th-century American lawyers
21st-century American judges
Emory University faculty
Georgia (U.S. state) lawyers
Georgia (U.S. state) state court judges
Georgia Court of Appeals judges
Georgia State University College of Law alumni
People from Henry County, Georgia
University of Georgia alumni